Meet may refer to:

People with the name
 Janek Meet (born 1974), Estonian footballer
 Meet Mukhi (born 2005), Indian child actor

Arts, entertainment, and media
 Meet (TV series), an early Australian television series which aired on ABC during 1957
 Meet Bros, music director duo from Gwalior
Meet (2021 series),is an Indian Television Series broadcasting on ZeeTV in India
 "Meet", an episode of Heartstopper

Convention or meeting
 Meet, a competitive event in track and field athletics
 All-comers track meet, usually small local track and field competitions
 Swap meet (or flea market), a type of bazaar that rents or provides space to people who want to sell or barter merchandise
 Train meet, a railroad term referring to the event of the meeting of two trains
 Google Meet, a video communication service developed by Google

Other uses
 Meet (mathematics), the greatest lower bound of a subset
 MEET – Middle East Entrepreneurs of Tomorrow (MEET), a program that brings together young Palestinian and Israeli leaders through technology and entrepreneurship

See also
 Meat (disambiguation)
 Meeting